Armand refer to:

People
 Armand (name), list of people with this name

Armand (photographer) (1901–1963), Armenian photographer
Armand (singer) (1946–2015), Dutch protest singer
Sean Armand (born 1991), American basketball player
Armand, duc d'Aiguillon (1750–1800), French noble
Armand of Kersaint (1742–1793), French sailor and politician

Places 
Saint-Armand, Quebec, Canada
Armand-e Olya, Iran
Armand-e Sofla, Iran
Armand Rural District, Iran
St. Armand, New York
St. Armand's Key in Florida
Armand-Jude River, a river in Charlevoix Regional County Municipality, Capitale-Nationale, Quebec, Canada

See also 
Arman (disambiguation) 
Arman (name) 
Armand Commission, first commission of the European Atomic Energy Community
Armand de Brignac, champagne brand produced by Champagne Cattier
Armand's Legion, Continental Army military unit
St Armand (disambiguation)